Vinyl tributyltin is an organotin compound with the formula Bu3SnCH=CH2 (Bu = butyl).  It is a white, air-stable solid.  It is used as a source of vinyl anion equivalent in Stille coupling reactions.  As a source of vinyltin reagents, early work used vinyl trimethyltin, but trimethyltin compounds are avoided nowadays owing to their toxicity.

Preparation
The compound is prepared by the reaction of vinylmagnesium bromide with tributyltin chloride.  It can be synthesized in the laboratory by hydrostannylation of acetylene with tributyltin hydride.  It is commercially available.

References

Organotin compounds
Vinyl compounds
Tin(IV) compounds